Sin Sang-woo ( born December 12, 1987 in Seoul) is a South Korean professional ice hockey winger. He is currently playing for Anyang Halla of Asia League Ice Hockey (ALIH).

References

External links

1987 births
Living people
South Korean ice hockey forwards
HL Anyang players
Asian Games silver medalists for South Korea
Asian Games bronze medalists for South Korea
Medalists at the 2011 Asian Winter Games
Medalists at the 2017 Asian Winter Games
Asian Games medalists in ice hockey
Ice hockey players at the 2011 Asian Winter Games
Ice hockey players at the 2017 Asian Winter Games
Olympic ice hockey players of South Korea
Ice hockey players at the 2018 Winter Olympics